Łebsko Lake is a coastal lake in the Pomeranian Voivodeship of Poland. It is the part of Słowiński National Park. However, it was never a part of the Baltic sea. It was formed because of the rise in the sea level and the flooding of the local meadows.

The Łeba River flows through Łebsko Lake just before it reaches the Baltic Sea at the town of Łeba. It is 16.4 km long and 7.6 km wide. Maximum depth is 6.3 m. With an area of 7,142 ha (71.42 km²), it is the largest Pomeranian lake.

Lakes of Poland
Lakes of Pomeranian Voivodeship